Ariel Elpidio Coronel (born 17 July 1987) is an Argentine professional footballer who plays as a centr-back for Deportes Iquique.

Career
Coronel started his career with Nueva Chicago in 2008. After three seasons in Primera B Metropolitana, which included sixty-four appearances and one goal, the team won promotion to Primera B Nacional for 2012–13. He scored his first goal in the second tier on 15 April 2013 against Banfield, in a campaign which ended with a return to Primera B Metropolitana. On 30 June 2014, after winning the 2013–14 with Nueva Chicago, Coronel joined Comunicaciones. He was selected fifty times by the club across the 2014, 2015 and 2016 seasons. Villa Dálmine won promotion in the latter, with the defender then joining them in Primera B Nacional.

In August 2017, Coronel completed a move to Almagro. Ten months later, Primera B Nacional's Mitre signed Coronel. He made his debut during a win away to Platense on 26 August. After a five-month stint with Atlanta to end 2019, Coronel headed abroad for the first time as he agreed terms with Chilean Primera División side Cobresal. His first appearance came in a 2–1 victory over Colo-Colo on 2 February 2020.

Career statistics
.

Honours
Nueva Chicago
Primera B Metropolitana: 2013–14

References

External links

1987 births
Living people
Sportspeople from Santiago del Estero Province
Argentine footballers
Association football defenders
Argentine expatriate footballers
Expatriate footballers in Chile
Argentine expatriate sportspeople in Chile
Primera Nacional players
Primera B Metropolitana players
Chilean Primera División players
Primera B de Chile players
Nueva Chicago footballers
Club Comunicaciones footballers
Villa Dálmine footballers
Club Almagro players
Club Atlético Mitre footballers
Club Atlético Atlanta footballers
Cobresal footballers
Deportes Iquique footballers